Qasemabad (also Romanized as Qāsemābād; also known as Kāz̧emābād and Qāsimābād) is a village in Beyza Rural District, Beyza District, Sepidan County, Fars Province, Iran. At the 2006 census, its population was 356, in 86 families.

References 

Populated places in Beyza County